Quercetin glucuronide or Quercetol glucuronide may refer to:
 Quercetin 3-O-glucuronide
 Quercetin 3'-O-glucuronide

References 
 Flavonoid glucuronides are substrates for human liver β-glucuronidase. Karen A O’Leary, Andrea J Day, Paul W Needs, William S Sly, Nora M O’Brien and Gary Williamson, FEBS Letters, Volume 503, Issue 1, 10 August 2001, pages 103–106,